Pump That Body may refer to:
 Pump That Body (Mr. Lee song)
 Pump That Body (Stevie B song)